Scincella devorator  is a species of skink endemic to northern Vietnam.

References

Scincella
Reptiles of Vietnam
Endemic fauna of Vietnam
Reptiles described in 2004
Taxa named by Ilya Darevsky
Taxa named by Nikolai Loutseranovitch Orlov
Taxa named by Ho Thu Cuc